is a Japanese manga series written and illustrated by Ayumi Nagata. It was serialized in Shogakukan's seinen manga magazine Hibana from March 2015 to May 2017, with its chapters collected in two tankōbon volumes.

Publication
Written and illustrated by Ayumi Nagata, Tsubaki to Tsumihoroboshi no Door was serialized in Shogakukan's seinen manga magazine  from March 6, 2015, to May 7, 2016. Shogakukan collected its chapters in two tankōbon volumes, released on September 11, 2015, and August 12, 2016.

Volume list

References

External links
 

Comedy anime and manga
Fantasy anime and manga
Seinen manga
Shogakukan manga